Hunters Point is an unincorporated community in Apache County, Arizona, United States. Hunters Point is located at the south of Black Creek Valley, adjacent south-flowing Black Creek, a north tributary to the southwest-flowing Puerco River.

References

Unincorporated communities in Apache County, Arizona
Unincorporated communities in Arizona